Portal del Sur is one of the terminus stations of the TransMilenio mass-transit system of Bogotá, Colombia, which opened in the year 2000.

Location

The Portal del Sur is located in the south of the city, more specifically on Autopista Sur where it meets the cemetery Jardines del Apogeo (carrera 72D).

History

The inauguration of the head station was made on April 15, 2006, although public space works and some mixed lanes continued until June of the same year.

The portal has a cycling service for users.

Beginning in September 2013, "TuLlave" travel cards work in the Portal del Sur, after months of discussions on how to start integrating the cards used in all phases of TransMilenio.

Station services

Old trunk services

Main line service

Feeder Routes

The station receives the following feeder routes:

 Avenida Bosa loop
 Bosa Centro loop
 Albán Carbonell loop
 Bosa Laureles loop
 Terminal Sur loop
 Perdomo loop
 Olarte - Timiza loop

Special Services 
The following special route also works:
  to the Cazucá neighborhood.

Circular Routes 
Currently, the following SITP circular routes are entered at the Portal del Sur:
  to the Tres Esquinas neighborhood.
  Urban Porciuncula, from Bosa San José (from 4:30 a.m. to 8:30 p.m.).
  Bogotá - San Mateo

Inter-city service

At the completion of construction, there are plans for inter-city service from the surrounding municipalities of Soacha and Sibaté. The station has capacity for 13 inter-city buses at the same time, plus additional space for feeder routes.

External links
TransMilenio

See also
Bogotá
TransMilenio
List of TransMilenio stations

TransMilenio